Richard William "Ric" Weiland (April 21, 1953 – June 24, 2006) was a computer software pioneer, programmer and philanthropist.  He was the second employee at Microsoft Corporation, joining the company during his final year at Stanford University.  At 35, he left Microsoft to focus his time on investment management and philanthropy, becoming a quiet but well-respected donor to the LGBTQ social justice movement, the environment, health and human services, and education. After his death, the Chronicle of Philanthropy called Weiland's bequest the 11th largest charitable gift in the nation with more than $165 million distributed between 20 nonprofit beneficiaries.

Early life 
Weiland was a high-school classmate and friend of Paul Allen, with whom he created the Lakeside Programmers Group at Lakeside School, a preparatory school in Seattle, Washington. Weiland, Allen, Bill Gates, and Gates' childhood best friend Kent Evans were involved with the Computer Center Corporation, using their PDP-10. They worked together to create a payroll program in COBOL for a company in Portland, Oregon, and wrote scheduling software for Lakeside School.

Microsoft 
Allen and Gates hired Weiland in 1975, the same year they founded Microsoft in Albuquerque.  As one of only five employees, Weiland was a lead programmer and developer for the company's BASIC and COBOL language systems.

After a couple semesters at Harvard Business School, in 1976–77, he rejoined Microsoft and became the project leader for Microsoft Works.  He was described by Allen as a "brilliant programmer" and a key contributor to the company's success.

Philanthropy 
During his life, Weiland was a donor to more than 60 nonprofit organizations and distributed an estimated $21.5 million, primarily between 1996–2006. His largest gift was to establish an endowed chair in his mother's name at Stanford - the Martha Meier Weiland professorship in the School of Medicine. He was influential as an active member of the Northwest gay community. During his time as a volunteer on the Pride Foundation's board of directors from 1997 to 2001, he helped win the fight to get General Electric to include sexual orientation in their non-discrimination policy. A member of the national GLSEN board (an organization focused on supporting gay-straight alliances in schools across the country) from 2002–2005, he was a fervent supporter of programs promoting safe schools for all kids.

Ten LGBTQ/AIDS organizations benefited from a donor advised fund Weiland established through the Pride Foundation at his death.  More than $56 million was distributed between 2007 and 2017 to these organizations. For most of these nonprofits it was the largest gift in their history.  Beneficiaries included: Lambda Legal, GLSEN, GLAAD, amFAR, the Task Force, OutRight Action International, PFLAG, Project Inform, In the Life Media and OutServe.

Eight other estate beneficiaries received endowment gifts including United Way of King County, the Fred Hutchinson Cancer Research Center, Seattle Children's Hospital, Lakeside School, Pride Foundation and three environmental organizations - the Sierra Club, the Environmental Defense Fund and the National Wildlife Federation. The Nature Conservancy received two direct gifts of $6.4 million each - one to support programs in Washington State and another to support their global environmental work.

In 2007, Weiland's $54 million gift to Stanford was called the largest bequest since the Stanford family's founding grant. Twelve endowed Weiland funds have been established at the university, with a focus on supporting undergraduate scholarships and graduate fellowships. More than 175 PhD students in more than 30 fields of study have received Weiland fellowships since the program started, making it the largest fellowship program on campus. There are also five endowed Weiland chairs, the Martha Meier Weiland professorship at the Stanford University School of Medicine, the William Hershel Weiland professorship in Physics honoring his father, and three Richard William Weiland chairs in the School of Engineering. Weiland funds also support the Stanford LGBTQ community through the university's first endowment to Student Affairs, undergraduate education, the School of Business, the Center for Social Innovation and the university's general endowment.

The permanent endowment funds established through Weiland's estate have a 2017 value of more than $150 million and generate approximately $7.5 million per year in program support.

Death 
Weiland died by suicide by gunshot on June 24, 2006. Besides his longstanding HIV diagnosis, he was reported to have suffered from clinical depression. Survivors include his partner Mike Schaefer as well as two nieces and two nephews in Oregon and Washington.

See also
History of Microsoft

References

External links 
 Richard William Weiland papers, 1969-2006, Stanford Digital Repository
 "Microsoft pioneer a major benefactor", Seattle Post-Intelligencer obituary
 "Seattle man who helped launch Microsoft left $65M for gay rights", Seattle Times obituary

1953 births
2006 deaths
Suicides by firearm in Washington (state)
American computer programmers
Microsoft employees
LGBT people from Washington (state)
Stanford University alumni
American investors
Lakeside School alumni
Harvard Business School alumni
2006 suicides
20th-century LGBT people